Marc Sondheimer is a producer at Pixar. Best known for his work on animated short-film Piper, that earned him wide spread acclaim and let him won the Academy Award for Best Animated Short Film, which he shared with director Alan Barillaro.

Filmography

Accolades

See also
 List of Canadian Academy Award winners and nominees
 List of Pixar staff

References

External links
 

Living people
Canadian animators
Canadian animated film producers
Pixar people
Producers who won the Best Animated Short Academy Award
Year of birth missing (living people)